Paskuhan (also Romanized as Paskūhān; also known as Poshtvān, Pushtvan, and Pushtwān) is a village in Karasf Rural District, in the Central District of Khodabandeh County, Zanjan Province, Iran. At the 2006 census, its population was 1,097, in 256 families.

References 

Populated places in Khodabandeh County